Robert Kiprono Cheruiyot (born August 10, 1988) is a Kenyan marathon runner.  He is known as a "true marathoner" who rarely races other distances. He finished fifth or better in the first four international marathons he has entered.

Biography
Hailing from Bomet in Kenya's Rift Valley Province, Cheruiyot's international debut was at the 2008 Frankfurt Marathon. Since he was not experienced, he had to purchase his own way and turn in a time under 2:14:00 to be reimbursed.  He proceeded to surprise everyone, including himself, winning the race with a course record 2:07:21.

In 2009, Cheruiyot finished fifth at the Alphen aan den Rijn  and followed it up with a fifth-place finish at the 2009 Boston Marathon six weeks later with time of 2:10:06. In the fall, he returned to Frankfurt to defend his title.  He turned in a time of 2:06:23, a new personal best, and finished second.

In 2010, Cheruiyot won the Boston Marathon with a time of 2:05:52, breaking the course record by more than a minute. Cheruiyot and 2009 champion, Deriba Merga, left the rest of the field behind at Heartbreak Hill, completing the mile that includes the hill in a blistering 4:37. Merga then faded and finished third. Tekeste Kebede finished second, more than 1:30 behind Cheruiyot with a time of 2:07:23. The previous record of 2:07:14 was held by Cheruiyot's countryman Robert Kipkoech Cheruiyot. Of his win, Cheruiyot said simply "I tried to show my talent." He said he would use his US$175,000 in winnings to purchase more cows for his  farm in Eldoret. He became the seventeenth Kenyan to win the men's Boston race in a period of 20 years.

His next major outing came at the 2010 Chicago Marathon, but he was below his Boston form, finishing in sixth place some three minutes behind race winner Samuel Wanjiru. He returned to defend his title at the 2011 Boston Marathon and although his time of 2:06:43 hours was comparatively quick, he came sixth and was over three and a half minutes behind winner Geoffrey Mutai. His second race of the year came at the Frankfurt Marathon, but again he was out of contention and finished fifth with a time of 2:06:29 hours.

Cheruiyot lives and trains with accomplished marathoner William Kiplagat, who also serves as his coach. He is not related to former Boston course record holder Robert Kipkoech Cheruiyot, although their similar names are often mentioned in press articles. Robert Kiprono Cheruiyot is a member of the Kipsigis tribe, whereas Robert Kipkoech Cheruiyot is from the Nandi tribe.

Personal bests 

(*) Downhill and point-to-point course
All information taken from IAAF profile.

Achievements 
All results regarding marathon, unless stated otherwise

References

External links 

"Past Champions", Boston Marathon.org

1988 births
Living people
People from Bomet County
Kipsigis people
Kenyan male long-distance runners
Kenyan male marathon runners
Frankfurt Marathon male winners
Boston Marathon male winners
21st-century Kenyan people